John Thomas "Joe" Kerrigan (28 February 1864 – 28 November 1942) was an Australian rules footballer who played with Fitzroy in the Victorian Football League (VFL). He was the first born player in VFL/AFL history.

Sources

External links

1864 births
1942 deaths
Australian rules footballers from Victoria (Australia)
Fitzroy Football Club (VFA) players
Fitzroy Football Club players